Nicola is a genus of calcareous sponge, comprising a single species, Nicola tetela.

References

Animals described in 1976